1H or 1-H may refer to:

Science
Hydrogen (1H), a chemical element
1H, a number of chemical compounds with one hydrogen atom
Hydrogen-1 (1H, or Protium), an isotope of hydrogen
1H, a grouping within an Astronomical catalog
1H 1617-155, a designation for the Scorpius X-1 X-ray source
1H 1908+047, a designation for the SS 433 star system
Astra 1H, an SES satellite launched in 1999

Other uses
1H, a model of Nissan H engine
1H NMR, a type of Proton NMR
1 H. Cas, a variant notation for AR Cassiopeiae
UH-1H, a type of Bell UH-1 Iroquois
Campath-1H, a brand of Alemtuzumab
Ardiden 1H, a model of HAL/Turbomeca Shakti
Blendkörper 1H, smoke grenade used by Germany in World War II
SSH 1H, alternate name for Washington State Route 534
1H, one hour
1H Year, 1st half of year

See also
H1 (disambiguation)